Phonology is a British peer-reviewed journal of phonology published by Cambridge University Press, the only journal devoted exclusively to this 
subfield of linguistics. The current editors are Colin J. Ewen (Leiden University), Ellen Kaisse (University of Washington), Daniel Currie Hall (Saint Mary's University) and Yoonjung Kang (University of Toronto). The volumes from 1997 on are available electronically with subscription via the site of the publisher.

Now published three times a year, in its first three years (1984–1987) it appeared once a year under the name Phonology Yearbook.

Most cited articles 
As of January 2011, the top 5 most cited articles were (Note that the years indicate "online publication"; so Clements 2008 is, for example, actually Clements 1985, when it was first published in paper format):

References

External links 
 

Publications established in 1984
Triannual journals
Phonology journals
English-language journals
Cambridge University Press academic journals